Charlie Cho Cha-lee (曹查理), a male actor in Hong Kong pornography films, especially during the 1980s. His over-acting approach can be regarded as one of the trademarks of Hong Kong soft porn films. He also worked in mainstream films, such as the Jackie Chan feature Police Story.

Filmography

Films

TV series

See others
Julian Cheung (nephew)
Anita Yuen (niece-in-law)

External links
 

Hong Kong male television actors
Hong Kong male film actors
Living people
1950 births
20th-century Hong Kong male actors
21st-century Hong Kong male actors